Home is the second album by UK rock band Home. It was released in 1972 by CBS Records.

Track listing
All tracks composed by Mick Stubbs; except where indicated
 "Dreamer" (Cliff Williams, Laurie Wiseman, Mick Cook, Mick Stubbs) – 5:30
 "Knave" – 3:45
 "Fancy Lady, Hollywood Child" (David Skillin, Mick Stubbs) – 4:05
 "Rise Up" – 3:24
 "Dear Lord" – 3:00
 "Baby Friend of Mine" – 4:42
 "Western Front" – 5:15
 "Lady of the Birds" (Cliff Williams, Laurie Wiseman, Mick Cook, Mick Stubbs) – 9:13

Personnel 
Home
 Mick Stubbs – lead vocals, electric guitar, 12-string guitar, keyboards
 Laurie Wisefield – acoustic guitar, lead guitar, steel guitar, vocals
 Clive John – keyboards
 Cliff Williams – bass guitar, vocals
 Mick Cook – drums, percussion, vocals
Technical
David Hentschel, Mike Stone - engineer
Denis Waugh - front cover photography

References

External links 
 Home album releases at Discogs.com
 Home album review, credits & releases at AllMusic.com

1972 albums
Albums produced by John Anthony (record producer)
CBS Records albums
albums recorded at Trident Studios